Archaeocyatha (or archaeocyathids 'ancient cups') is a taxon of extinct, sessile, reef-building marine sponges that lived in warm tropical and subtropical waters during the Cambrian Period. It is believed that the centre of the Archaeocyatha origin is now located in East Siberia, where they are first known from the beginning of the Tommotian Age of the Cambrian, 525 million years ago (mya). In other regions of the world, they appeared much later, during the Atdabanian, and quickly diversified into over a hundred families. They became the planet's very first reef-building animals and are an index fossil for the Lower Cambrian worldwide.

Preservation 
The remains of Archaeocyatha are mostly preserved as carbonate structures in a limestone matrix. This means that the fossils cannot be chemically or mechanically isolated, save for some specimens that have already eroded out of their matrices, and their morphology has to be determined from thin cuts of the stone in which they were preserved.

Geological history 
Today, the archaeocyathan families are recognizable by small but consistent differences in their fossilized structures: Some archaeocyathans were built like nested bowls, while others were as long as 300mm. Some archaeocyaths were solitary organisms, while others formed colonies.  In the beginning of the Toyonian Age around 516 mya, the archaeocyaths went into a sharp decline. Almost all species became extinct by the Middle Cambrian, with the final-known species, Antarcticocyathus webberi, disappearing just prior to the end of the Cambrian period. Their rapid decline and disappearance coincided with a rapid diversification of the Demosponges.

The archaeocyathids were important reef-builders in the early to middle Cambrian, with reefs (and indeed any accumulation of carbonates) becoming very rare after the group's extinction until the diversification of new taxa of coral reef-builders in the Ordovician.

Antarcticocyathus  was considered the only late Cambrian archaeocyath, but its reinterpretation as a lithisid sponge means that there are now no archaocyaths post the mid-Cambrian.

Morphology
The typical archaeocyathid resembled a hollow horn coral. Each had a conical or vase-shaped porous skeleton of calcite similar to that of a sponge. The structure appeared like a pair of perforated, nested ice cream cones. Their skeletons consisted of either a single porous wall (Monocyathida), or more commonly as two concentric porous walls, an inner and outer wall separated by a space. Inside the inner wall was a cavity (like the inside of an ice cream cup). At the base, these pleosponges were held to the substrate by a holdfast. The body presumably occupied the space between the inner and outer shells (the intervallum).

Ecology
Flow tank experiments suggest that archaeocyathan morphology allowed them to exploit flow gradients, either by passively pumping water through the skeleton, or, as in present-day, extant sponges, by drawing water through the pores, removing nutrients, and expelling spent water and wastes through the pores into the central space.

The size of the pores places a limit on the size of plankton that archaeocyaths could have consumed; different species had different sized pores, the largest large enough to conceivably consume mesozooplankton, possibly giving rise to different ecological niches within a single reef.

Distribution
The archaeocyathans inhabited coastal areas of shallow seas. Their widespread distribution over almost the entire Cambrian world, as well as the taxonomic diversity of the species, might be explained by surmising that, like true sponges, they had a planktonic larval stage that enabled their wide spread.

Taxonomy
Their phylogenetic affiliation has been subject to changing interpretations, yet the consensus is growing that the archaeocyath was indeed a kind of sponge, thus sometimes called a pleosponge.  But some invertebrate paleontologists have placed them in an extinct, separate phylum, known appropriately as the Archaeocyatha.  However, one cladistic analysis suggests that Archaeocyatha is a clade nested within the phylum Porifera (better known as the true sponges).

The clade Archaeocyatha have traditionally been divided into Regulares and Irregulares (Rowland, 2001):

 Hetairacyathida (incertae sedis)
 Regulares
 Monocyathida
 Capsulocyathida
 Ajacicyathida
 Irregulares
 Thalassocyathida
 Archaeocyathida
 Kazakhstanicyathida

However, Okulitch (1955), who at the time regarded the archaeocyathans as outside of Porifera, divided the phylum in three classes:

Phylum Archaeocyatha Vologdin, 1937
Class Monocyathea Okulitch, 1943
Class Archaeocyathea Okulitch, 1943
Class Anthocyathea Okulitch, 1943

Notes

References
Emiliani, Cesare. (1992). Planet Earth : Cosmology, Geology, & the Evolution of Life & the Environment. Cambridge University Press. (Paperback Edition ), p 451
 Okulitch, V. J., 1955: Part E – Archaeocyatha and Porifera. Archaeocyatha, E1-E20 in Moore, R. C., (ed.) 1955: Treatise on Invertebrate Paleontology. Geological Society of America & University of Kansas Press, Lawrence, Kansas, 1955, xviii-E122.

External links
 knowledge base and interactive key for identification of archaeocyathan genera: http://www.infosyslab.fr/archaeocyatha/
(UCMP Berkeley) Archaeocyathans
(Palaeos Invertebrates) Archaeocyatha

Cambrian sponges
Index fossils